The 1993 Storm of the Century (also known as the 93 Superstorm, The No Name Storm, or the Great Blizzard of '93/1993) was a cyclonic storm that formed over the Gulf of Mexico on March 12, 1993. The cold weather, heavy snowfall, high winds and storm surges that the storm brought affected a very large area; at its height, it stretched from Canada to Honduras. The cyclone moved through the Gulf of Mexico and then through the eastern United States before moving on to eastern Canada. It eventually dissipated in the North Atlantic Ocean on March 15.

Birmingham, Alabama, reported a rare  of snow. Between Louisiana and Cuba, the hurricane-force winds produced high storm surges across the Big Bend of Florida which, in combination with scattered tornadoes, killed dozens of people.

Record cold temperatures were seen across portions of the Southern United States and Eastern United States in the wake of this storm. In the United States, the storm was responsible for the loss of electric power to more than 10 million households. An estimated 40 percent of the country's population experienced the effects of the storm and it lead to a total of 208 fatalities. In all, the storm resulted in 318 deaths, and caused $5.5 billion (1993 USD) in damages.

The greatest recorded snowfall amounts were at Mount Le Conte in Tennessee, where  of snow fell, and Mount Mitchell in North Carolina, the tallest mountain in eastern North America, where  were measured to fall and  snow drifts were reported.

Meteorological history

A volcanic winter is thought to have started with the 1991 eruption of Mount Pinatubo. The temperature in the stratosphere rose to several degrees higher than normal, due to the absorption of radiation by the aerosol. The stratospheric cloud from the eruption persisted in the atmosphere for three years. The eruption, while not directly responsible, may have played a part in the formation of the 1993 Storm of the Century.

During March 11 and 12, 1993, temperatures over much of the eastern United States began to drop as an arctic high pressure system built over the Midwestern United States and the Great Plains. Concurrently, an extratropical area of low pressure formed over Mexico along a stationary front draped west to east. By the afternoon of March 12, a defined airmass boundary was present along the deepening low. An initial burst of convective precipitation off the southern coast of Texas (facilitated by the transport of tropical moisture into the region) enabled initial intensification of the surface feature on March 12. Supported by a strong split-polar jet stream and a shortwave trough, the nascent system rapidly deepened. A powerful low-level jet over eastern Cuba and the Gulf of Mexico enhanced a cold front extending from the low southward to the Isthmus of Tehuantepec. Furthermore, the subtropical jet stream was displaced unusually far south, reaching into the Pacific Ocean near Central America and extending toward Honduras and Jamaica. Intense ageostrophic flow was noted over the southern United States, with winds flowing perpendicular to isobars over Louisiana.

As the area of low pressure moved through the central Gulf of Mexico, a short wave trough in the northern branch of the jet stream fused with the system in the southern stream, which further strengthened the surface low. A squall line developed along the system's cold front, which moved rapidly across the eastern Gulf of Mexico through Florida and Cuba. The cyclone's center moved into north-west Florida early on the morning of March 13, with a significant storm surge in the northwestern Florida peninsula that drowned several people. This initially caused the storm to be a blizzard but also cyclonic.

Barometric pressures recorded during the storm were low. Low pressure records for March were set in areas of twelve states along the Eastern Seaboard, with all-time low pressure records set between Tallahassee and Washington, D.C. Snow began to spread over the eastern United States, and a large squall line moved from the Gulf of Mexico into Florida and Cuba. The storm system tracked up the East Coast during Saturday and into Canada by early Monday morning. In the storm's wake, unseasonably cold temperatures were recorded over the next two days in the Southeast.

Forecasting
Storm of the Century marked a milestone in the weather forecasting of the United States. By March 8, 1993, several operational numerical weather prediction models and medium-range forecasters at the United States National Weather Service recognized the threat of a significant snowstorm. This marked the first time National Weather Service meteorologists were able to predict accurately a system's severity five days in advance. Official blizzard warnings were issued two days before the storm arrived, as shorter-range models began to confirm the predictions. Forecasters were finally confident enough of the computer-forecast models to support decisions by several northeastern states to declare a state of emergency even before the snow started to fall.

Impact

The storm complex was large and widespread, affecting at least 26 US states and much of eastern Canada. It brought in cold air along with heavy precipitation and hurricane-force winds which, ultimately, caused a blizzard over the affected area; this also included thundersnow from Georgia to Pennsylvania and widespread whiteout conditions. Snow flurries were seen in the air as far south as Jacksonville, Florida, and some areas of central Florida received a trace of snow. The storm severely impacted both ground and air travel. Airports were closed all along the eastern seaboard, and flights were cancelled or diverted, thus stranding many passengers along the way. Every airport from Halifax, Nova Scotia, to Tampa was temporarily closed due to the storm. Highways were also closed or restricted all across the affected region, even in states generally well prepared for snow emergencies.

Mount Le Conte, Tennessee recorded 56" and Mount Mitchell, NC recorded 50" of snowfall. The volume of the storm's total snowfall was later computed to be , an amount which would weigh (depending on the variable density of snow) between 5.4 and 27 billion tons.

The weight of the record snowfalls collapsed several factory roofs in the South; and snowdrifts on the windward sides of buildings caused a few decks with substandard anchoring to fall from homes. Though the storm was forecast to strike the snow-prone Appalachian Mountains, hundreds of people were nonetheless rescued from the Appalachians, many caught completely off guard on the Appalachian Trail or in cabins and lodges in remote locales. Boone's Appalachian State University closed that week, for the first time in its history. Stranded motorists at Deep Gap broke into Parkway Elementary School to survive, and National Guard helicopters dropped hay in fields to keep livestock from starving in northern N.C. mountain counties.

In Virginia, the LancerLot sports arena in Vinton collapsed due to the weight of the record snowfall, forcing the Virginia Lancers of the ECHL to relocate to nearby Roanoke and become the Roanoke Express. Also collapsing were the roofs of a Lowe's store in Christiansburg and the Dedmon Center, at Radford University. Thousands of travelers were stranded along interstate highways in Southwest Virginia.
Electricity was not restored to many isolated rural areas for up to three weeks, with power outages occurring all over the east. Nearly 60,000 lightning strikes were recorded as the storm swept over the country for a total of 72 hours. As one of the most powerful, complex storms in recent history, this storm was described as the "Storm of the Century" by many of the areas affected.

Gulf of Mexico
The United States Coast Guard dealt with "absolutely incredible, unbelievable" conditions within the Gulf of Mexico. The  freighter Miss Beholden ran aground on a coral reef  from Key West, Florida. Several other smaller vessels sank in the rough seas. In all, the Coast Guard rescued 235 people from over 100 boats across the Gulf of Mexico during the tempest.

Florida

Besides producing record-low barometric pressure across a swath of the Southeast and Mid-Atlantic states, and contributing to one of the nation's biggest snowstorms, the low produced a potent squall line ahead of its cold front. The squall line produced a serial derecho as it moved into Florida and Cuba shortly after midnight on March 13. Straight-line winds gusted above  at many locations in Florida as the squall line moved through. A substantial tree fall was seen statewide from this system. The supercells in the derecho produced eleven tornadoes. The first tornado was an F2 that touched down in Chiefland at 04:38 UTC on March 13, damaging several mobile homes and downing trees and power lines. Three people were killed and seven people sustained injures. Around the same time, an F1 tornado was spawned near Crystal River. After moving eastward into the town, the twister damaged 15 homes, several of them severely. A total of three people were injured. The next tornado was a waterspout that moved ashore over Treasure Island around 05:00 UTC. Rated F0, the tornado deroofed one home, damaged several others, and impacted a few boats.

Around 05:04 UTC, an F0 tornado was reported in New Port Richey, damaging several homes and injuring 11 people. About 16 minutes later, an F2 tornado formed to the southwest of Ocala. Many trees fell and several storage buildings and a warehouse suffered extensive damage, while one hangar was destroyed and two others received major damage at the Ocala International Airport. At 05:20 UTC, approximately the same time as the Ocala tornado, another twister – rated F1 – touched down near LaCrosse. Several trees and power lines were downed and a few homes were destroyed, one from a propane explosion. One person was killed and four others received injuries. About 10 minutes later, another F2 twister was spawned near Howey-in-the-Hills. It moved through Mount Dora, destroying 13 homes, substantially damaging 80 homes, and inflicting minor damage on 266 homes. One person, a 5-month-old baby, was killed, while two others were injured.

About 30 minutes later,
an F1 tornado formed in Jacksonville, demolishing four dwellings and damaging sixteen others. Also at 06:00 UTC, an F0 tornado spawned near Bartow snapped a few trees and damaged a few doors. The eleventh and final tornado developed in Jacksonville at 06:10 UTC. The twister damaged a few trees near the Jacksonville International Airport.

A substantial storm surge was also generated along the gulf coast from Apalachee Bay in the Florida Panhandle to north of Tampa Bay. Due to the angle of the coast relative to the approaching squall, Taylor County along the eastern portion of Apalachee Bay and Hernando County north of Tampa were especially hard-hit.

With little advance warning of incoming severe conditions, some coastal residents were awakened in the early morning of March 13 by the waters of the Gulf of Mexico rushing into their homes. More people died from drowning in this storm than during Hurricanes Hugo and Andrew combined. Overall, the storm's surge, winds, and tornadoes damaged or destroyed 18,000 homes. A total of 47 people died in Florida due to this storm.

Cuba
In Cuba, wind gusts reached  in the Havana area. It is the most damaging squall line ever recorded in Cuba.

There was widespread and significant damage in Cuba, with damage estimated as intense as F2. The squall line finally moved out of Cuba near sunrise, leaving 10 deaths and US$1 billion in damage on the island.

North Atlantic
The cargo ship Gold Bond Conveyor en route from Halifax, Nova Scotia, Canada to Tampa, Florida foundered in the Atlantic Ocean 60 nautical miles (110 km) SE of Sable Island, Nova Scotia with the loss of all 33 crew. It is thought that water entered the hold where gypsum ore was being stored and caused the rock to shift and harden. This instability compounded with winds of 90 miles an hour (145 km/h) and 100-foot (30 m) waves led to her sinking. The Liberian-flagged ship was owned by Skaarup Shipping Corp., of Greenwich, Connecticut, and under charter to National Gypsum Co., a U.S. company. The ship had previously survived the Perfect Storm of 1991 two years earlier.

Tornadoes spawned by the storm

See also

List of derecho events
Great Flood of 1993
Hurricane Sandy
Early 2014 North American cold wave
Snowmageddon
January 2016 North American blizzard
February 13–17, 2021 North American winter storm – The costliest winter storm on record, also killed 200+ people
 The Day After Tomorrow - Uses archive footage of the 1993 storm.

References

Blizzards in the United States
Blizzards in Canada
1993 Storm Of The Century
1993 meteorology
1993 natural disasters
1993 natural disasters in the United States
1993 disasters in Canada
1993 in Cuba
Derechos in the United States
F2 tornadoes
Tornadoes in the United States
Natural disasters in Alabama
Natural disasters in Connecticut
Natural disasters in Florida
Natural disasters in Georgia (U.S. state)
Natural disasters in Kentucky
Natural disasters in New Brunswick
Natural disasters in New Hampshire
Natural disasters in New York (state)
Natural disasters in North Carolina
Natural disasters in Nova Scotia
Natural disasters in Ontario
Natural disasters in Pennsylvania
Natural disasters in Quebec
Natural disasters in Tennessee
Natural disasters in Virginia
Natural disasters in West Virginia
Natural disasters in Washington, D.C.
March 1993 events in North America
Volcanic winters